Rawlings may refer to:

Rawlings (company), a U.S. sports equipment company
Rawlings, Maryland, an unincorporated community in Allegany County, Maryland
Rawlings (surname), including a list of people with the name

See also
Rawlins (disambiguation)